Tirumalagiri is a new municipality in Suryapet district of the Indian state of Telangana. It is located in  Thirumalagiri mandal of Suryapet division.

References

Cities and towns in Suryapet district
Mandal headquarters in Suryapet district